Horrace Smith "Smitty" Duke (June 12, 1942 – September 18, 2010) was an American volleyball player who competed in the 1968 Summer Olympics. He was born in Center, Texas and died in Unicoi, Tennessee.

References

1942 births
2010 deaths
American men's volleyball players
Olympic volleyball players of the United States
Volleyball players at the 1968 Summer Olympics
Volleyball players at the 1967 Pan American Games
Pan American Games gold medalists for the United States
Pan American Games silver medalists for the United States
Volleyball players at the 1971 Pan American Games
Pan American Games medalists in volleyball
Medalists at the 1967 Pan American Games
Medalists at the 1971 Pan American Games